Broderick Christopher Cormier (born August 19, 1967), known as Chris Cormier, is a retired American bodybuilder who competed in the IFBB.

Biography
He was born in  Palm Springs, California in 1967. In 1984, he placed 4th in the 167 pound weight group at the California Interscholastic Federation State High School Wrestling Championships for Palm Springs High School. Cormier's first Mr. Olympia came in 1994, where he placed 6th. The same year he also participated in his first Arnold Classic and the Ironman Pro Invitational, where he placed 4th and 2nd respectively. In 1995 he competed in his first Night of Champions tournament (now called the New York Pro), where he placed 6th. Cormier has been featured in many fitness and bodybuilding magazines, including being featured on the cover of Muscular Development magazine.

In mid-2006 Cormier was hospitalized with an infected spine resulting from a bodybuilding-related injury before he was due to train with veteran English bodybuilder and ex-Mr. Olympia, Dorian Yates. His recovery included extensive physiotherapy  but the injury, and a subsequent one involving his triceps, forced his retirement.

Since then he has turned his efforts into working with athletes all over the world, sharing the knowledge and expertise he gained over his 30+ years in the sport, which included competing in over 72 IFBB competitions, with 12 professional wins and first runner-up a record 6 times at the prestigious Arnold Classic.  His website is www.thegrind.guru.

In 2019, a documentary film called Chris Cormier: I Am the Real Deal, about Chris' life and career will be released.

The below is an incomplete competition history.

Competition history
1987 NPC California Championships, Teenage division, 1st
1987 NPC Teen Nationals, Light-Heavyweight, 1st
1991 NPC USA Championships, Heavyweight, 4th
1993 NPC USA Championships, Heavyweight, 1st and Overall
1994 Arnold Classic, 4th
1994 Grand Prix France, 7th
1994 Grand Prix Germany, 6th
1994 Ironman Pro Invitational, 2nd
1994 Mr. Olympia, 6th
1995 Grand Prix England, 5th
1995 Grand Prix France, 5th
1995 Grand Prix Germany, 4th
1995 Grand Prix Russia, 5th
1995 Grand Prix Spain, 4th
1995 Grand Prix Ukraine, 4th
1995 Night of Champions, 4th
1995 Mr. Olympia, 6th
1996 Grand Prix Czech Republic, 8th
1996 Grand Prix England, 8th
1996 Grand Prix Germany, 7th
1996 Grand Prix Russia, 8th
1996 Grand Prix Spain, 8th
1996 Grand Prix Switzerland, 8th
1996 Mr. Olympia, 7th
1997 Canada Pro Cup, 3rd
1997 Grand Prix Czech Republic, 2nd
1997 Grand Prix England, 2nd
1997 Grand Prix Finland, 2nd
1997 Grand Prix Germany, 6th
1997 Grand Prix Hungary, 8th
1997 Grand Prix Russia, 4th
1997 Grand Prix Spain, 6th
1997 Night of Champions, 1st
1997 Mr. Olympia, 8th
1997 Toronto Pro Invitational, 3rd
1998 Arnold Classic, 5th
1998 Grand Prix Finland, 4th
1998 Grand Prix Germany, 4th
1998 Mr. Olympia, 6th
1999 Arnold Classic, 3rd
1999 Ironman Pro Invitational, 1st
1999 Mr. Olympia, 3rd
2000 Arnold Classic, 2nd
2000 Ironman Pro Invitational, 1st
2001 Arnold Classic, 2nd
2001 Grand Prix Australia, 1st
2001 Grand Prix England, 2nd
2001 Grand Prix Hungary, 2nd
2001 Grand Prix New Zealand, 2nd
2001 Ironman Pro Invitational, 1st
2001 Mr. Olympia, 5th
2001 San Francisco Pro Invitational, 1st
2002 Arnold Classic, 2nd
2002 Grand Prix Australia, 1st
2002 Grand Prix Austria, 1st
2002 Grand Prix England, 3rd
2002 Grand Prix Holland, 2nd
2002 Ironman Pro Invitational, 1st
2002 Mr. Olympia, 3rd
2002 San Francisco Pro Invitational, 2nd
2002 Show of Strength Pro Championship, 3rd
2003 Arnold Classic, 2nd
2003 Grand Prix Australia, 1st
2003 San Francisco Pro Invitational, 2nd
2003 Show of Strength Pro Championship, 7th
2004 Arnold Classic, 2nd
2004 Grand Prix Australia, 2nd
2004 Grand Prix England, 2nd
2004 Grand Prix Holland, 2nd
2004 Mr. Olympia, 7th
2005 Arnold Classic, 2nd
2005 Grand Prix Australia, 2nd
2005 Mr. Olympia, 13th
2005 San Francisco Pro Invitational, 1st
2007 IFBB Montreal Pro Classic, 4th

See also
List of male professional bodybuilders
List of female professional bodybuilders

References

External links
Chris Cormier Gallery

Cormier, Chris
Cormier, Chris
African-American bodybuilders
Cormier, Chris
Sportspeople from Palm Springs, California
Cajun people
Palm Springs High School people
21st-century African-American people
20th-century African-American sportspeople